The 2015–16 season was Hereford's first season since forming as a phoenix club after the demise of Hereford United in 2014.

First-team squad 
As of 22 May 2016

Transfers

Transfers in

Transfers out

Loans in

Pre-season

Competitions

Overview

Midland Football League Premier Division

League table

Results summary

Matches

FA Vase 

Hereford entered the competition in the second qualifying round.

Midland Football League Cup

HFA County Challenge Cup

Squad statistics 
 As of match played 22 May 2016

Goals

Club awards

End-of-season awards

References

Hereford F.C.